For Felix is a pop punk band originally from Bridgewater, New Jersey, United States. The band, formed in 2002, had an original lineup that included Dan Perea (lead vocals/bass),  Whit Maull (guitar), Jay Gelardi (drums), and Pete Petrocelli (guitar).   Jeff Krenn (vocals/guitar), and Patrick Jolkovski (drums) replaced Petrocelli and Gelardi in 2005.  The band toured in the US with other acts including Gym Class Heroes, Greeley Estates, My American Heart, Rory and made an appearance on the 2006 Taste Of Chaos tour.  The band is on an indefinite break.

The band's song "A Simple Message" and an interview were aired on the podcast Hi, My Name Is Mark hosted by Mark Hoppus of +44 and Blink 182.

Discography

Albums
Everyone's Got a Girlfriend (2003)
Rise Above (2004)
For Felix (2006)
What We're After (2021)

Compilations
"A Simple Message" Punk the Clock Vol. 1 (2004)
"Too Sad for Hollywood"  Drive Thru Records: Bands You Love, Have Heard of, and Should Know (2005)

External links
 For Felix on Spotify
 For Felix on iTunes

Pop punk groups from New Jersey